Events in the year 1973 in the Republic of India.

Incumbents
 President of India – V. V. Giri
 Prime Minister of India – Indira Gandhi
 Chief Justice of India – Sarv Mittra Sikri (until 26 April), Ajit Nath Ray (starting 26 April)

Governors
 Andhra Pradesh – Khandubhai Kasanji Desai 
 Assam – Braj Kumar Nehru (until 19 September), L. P. Singh (starting 19 September)
 Bihar – Dev Kant Baruah (until 4 February), Ramchandra Dhondiba Bhandare (starting 4 February)
 Gujarat – 
 until 17 March: Shriman Narayan 
 17 March-4 April: P.N. Bhagwati 
 starting 4 April: Kambanthodath Kunhan Vishwanatham 
 Haryana – Birendra Narayan Chakraborty 
 Himachal Pradesh – S. Chakravarti
 Jammu and Kashmir – Bhagwan Sahay (until 3 July), L. K. Jha (starting 3 July)
 Karnataka – Mohanlal Sukhadia
 Kerala – V. Viswanathan (until 1 April), N. N. Wanchoo (starting 1 April) 
 Madhya Pradesh – Satya Narayan Sinha 
 Maharashtra – Ali Yavar Jung 
 Manipur – B. K. Nehru (until 20 September), L.P. Singh (starting 21 September)
 Meghalaya – B.K. Nehru (until 18 September), L.P. Singh (starting 18 September)
 Nagaland – B.K. Nehru (until 18 September), L.P. Singh (starting 18 September)
 Odisha – Basappa Danappa Jatti 
 Punjab – Dadappa Chintappa Pavate (until 21 May), Mahendra Mohan Choudhry (starting 21 May)
 Rajasthan – Sardar Jogendra Singh 
 Tamil Nadu – Kodardas Kalidas Shah 
 Tripura – B. K. Nehru (until 23 September), L. P. Singh (starting 23 September)
 Uttar Pradesh – Akbar Ali Khan 
 West Bengal – Anthony Lancelot Dias

Events
 National income - 672,407 million
 10 January - P. V. Narasimha Rao resigns as Chief minister of Andhra Pradesh following the resignation of ministers from Coastal Andhra post the 1972 Jai Andhra movement.
 1 April – Government campaign to save the tiger from extinction.
 31 May – Indian Airlines Flight 440 crash at Palam International Airport killing 48 of the 65 on board.
 24 April – Verdict of Kesavananda Bharati v. State of Kerala pronounced. Supreme Court of India upholds basic structure doctrine. 
 1 November – State of Mysore is renamed Karnataka State.

Law
Foreign Exchange Regulation Act was passed.
Code of Criminal Procedure (CrPC) was enacted.

Births

January to June
5 January – Uday Chopra, actor.
11 January – Rahul Dravid, cricketer.
12 January – Saakshi Tanwar, actress.
20 February – Priyanshu Chatterjee, film actor, previously model.
14 March  Rohit Shetty, film director.
20 March – Arjun Atwal, golfer.
3 April  Prabhu Deva, actor, choreographer and director.
6 April – Prashanth Thyagarajan, actor.
24 April – Sachin Tendulkar, cricketer.
26 April  Samuthirakani, actor and film director.
1 May – Diana Hayden, Miss World and actress
17 June – Leander Paes, tennis player.
18 June – Baljit Singh Dhillon, field hockey player.
29 June – Samir Choughule, actor and writer

July to December
 30 July  Sonu Sood, actor and philanthropist. 
1 September – Ram Kapoor, actor.
5 October – Vishwas Nangare Patil, Indian police officer.
10 October  S. S. Rajamouli, film director.
1 November – Aishwarya Rai, actress.
27 November – Satyendra Dubey, LATE Indian Engineering Service (IES) officer. (d. 2003)

Full date unknown
Arunabha Sengupta, novelist.

Deaths

 31 May – Mohan Kumaramangalam, politician.

14 October – Siddavanahalli Krishna Sarma, writer, translator, freedom fighter, journalist, social worker and educationist (b. 1904)
20 November – Prabodhankar Thackeray, Politician, Social Activist in the Samyukta Maharashtra Movement, Author (b. 1885)
30 December – V. Nagayya, actor, composer, director, producer, writer and playback singer (b. 1904).

References

See also 
 List of Bollywood films of 1973

 
India
Years of the 20th century in India